Finam Holdings is a financial services company headquartered in Moscow, Russia. It is the parent company of Finam Investment Company. In April 2017 it was the third largest brokerage firm in Russia, and ranked second among providers of individual investment accounts in the country. 

Finam’s subsidiaries include CJSC Finam, the asset management company Finam Management, the investment fund Finam Global, WhoTrades Ltd., Finam Bank, Finam Training Center, and FinamAero (Bolshoye Gryzlovo airfield located in the Serpukhovo district of the Moscow region).

History 
In 1994, Finans-Analytic Investment Company was founded by Viktor Remsha. By 1996 it became a clearing firm on the Russian Stock exchange and opened its first regional branch in Noyabrsk (Tyumen Region). By the end of the decade the company had become a member of the National Association of Securities Market Participants (NAUFOR), the Moscow Exchange (MSE), the St. Petersburg Stock Exchange, the Moscow Interbank Currency Exchange (MICEX) and the Russian Trading System. In 1999, the company launched its first workshops for investors, which later became the Finam Training Center with over 100,000 yearly students. In 2000 the company began offering online trading services and launched the finam.ru website.

In 2002 the Finans-Analytic group became Finam Holdings and began U.S. securities brokerage. In 2004, Finam acquired Megavatt Bank and later renamed it as Finam Bank. 

Finam Holdings expanded internationally by becoming a member of the Frankfurt Stock Exchange and in 2011 it opened offices in Bangkok, Beijing, and New York City. Today, Finam has branch offices in 90 Russian cities.

Investment in IT projects 
Finam is a leader in Russian IT investment. It has held controlling interests in sites like Mamba, MoneyMail, E-generator, and SMI2. It has had minority stakes in Badoo and Shape Gmbh.

References

External links
 
 http://investing.businessweek.com/research/stocks/private/person.asp?personId=30423617&privcapId=84579479&previousCapId=8793535&previousTitle=SBERBANK
 https://web.archive.org/web/20131103112607/http://bankinru.com/bank/finam-bank
 http://www.finam.ru/analysis/newsitem6A793/

 
Financial services companies of Russia
Investment companies of Russia
Holding companies of Russia
Online brokerages
Companies based in Moscow